The Franklin Delano Roosevelt gold half eagle is a commemorative coin issued by the United States Mint in 1997.

Legislation
The United States Commemorative Coin Act of 1996 authorized the production of a commemorative $5 gold coin (half eagle) to commemorate the public opening of the Franklin Delano Roosevelt Memorial in Washington, DC. The act allowed the coins to be struck in both proof and uncirculated finishes.

Design
The obverse of the Franklin Delano Roosevelt gold half eagle, designed by T. James Ferrell, is based on one of FDR's favorite photographs taken in 1938 depicting the commander-in-chief on the bridge of the USS Houston wearing a boat cloak that became a familiar trademark for many Americans. The reverse, designed by
James Peed, features a rendering of the Presidential seal displayed at FDR's 1933 inaugural.

Specifications
 Display Box Color: Maroon
 Edge: Reeded
 Weight: 8.359 grams; 0.27 troy ounce
 Diameter: 21.59 millimeters; 0.850 inch
 Composition: 90% Gold, 6% Silver, 4% Copper

See also

 List of United States commemorative coins and medals (1990s)
 United States commemorative coins
 United States Commemorative Coin Act of 1996

References

Modern United States commemorative coins
Cultural depictions of Franklin D. Roosevelt
Currencies introduced in 1997
Sculptures of presidents of the United States
Monuments and memorials to Franklin D. Roosevelt in the United States
1997 establishments in the United States
United States gold coins